Severans can refer to:
the Severan dynasty, a lineage of Roman emperors
the followers of Severus of Antioch
erroneously, the Severians, a former Slavic tribe